Stenoma impurata is a moth of the family Depressariidae. It is found in Suriname.

The wingspan is about 17 mm. The forewings and hindwings are ochreous whitish.

References

Moths described in 1915
Taxa named by Edward Meyrick
Stenoma